Romina Arena is an Italian-American popera, operatic pop, pop classical crossover, rock opera and new-age singer-songwriter.

Early life
Romina Arena was born and raised in Palermo, Sicily, to a Sicilian mother, Rita and a Roman father, Renato. By the age of four, Arena became a Mouseketeer for Topolino, the Italian version of Disney's Mickey Mouse Club She also performed as a classical ballerina in the major Italian Theatres at the age of seven. Performing with other children from different parts of Europe, Arena developed knowledge of 10 languages, including Italian, English, French, Spanish, German, Portuguese, Japanese, Greek, Bulgarian and Hebrew. Arena calls herself "the voice of women with a broken heart" but is also referred to as "the voice of women who never give up"  When Arena was a teenager after leaving Disney behind and starting a solo career, she was attacked backstage of a prime time television show in Sicily. Her attacker severed her vocal cords with a pocket knife, leaving her comatose. Her physicians told her she would never sing again. However, she completely recovered over a three-year period. She fully regained her vocal abilities; a side effect of the attack was that she developed a five-octave vocal range as a result of the trauma to her pharynx.

After Arena's father Renato died, she left Italy for the United States with her mother. There she came under the wing of Sal Pacino and his wife Katherin Pacino, the father and stepmother of actor Al Pacino. She resides in Los Angeles, California.

Career
In 2000, Arena signed a production deal with music producer Bob Johnston to produce a full 12-track studio album. Songs included "Make You Feel My Love", written by Bob Dylan, "I Can't Make You Love Me", written by Mike Reid and Allen Shamblin, and "Smile" composed by Charlie Chaplin as well as many others although the album was never released. In 2001, Arena covered the classic Japanese song, "Subaru". Originally written and recorded by Shinji Tanimura, Romina recorded the song in Japanese and the song went multi-platinum and charted in the top position for a few weeks. In 2003, Microsoft used her first Rock Opera single "Satellite", recorded in both English and Italian as the theme song for the video game Project Gotham Racing 2. In 2010, she was the first recording artist to debut a live concert in the "Second Life" video game and in 2013 recorded "I Want Love" as a featured track on the soundtrack for one of the most successful video game franchises in the history of the business, "The Best of Silent Hill"  released October 29 on Perseverance Records.

According to her interviews and press releases, Arena has had several number-one hits in Italy, Germany, Australia and Japan, selling over 4 million records worldwide over the lifetime of her career. Arena developed a style that is a blend of operatic pop, rock and classical crossover. In 2012, she released the album Morricone.Uncovered in which she performs film music by Ennio Morricone to which she had set her own lyrics. According to the Malibu Times, Morricone said "I decided to work with her because of her hard work and incredible successes achieved. But most importantly, I consider her the most dominant voice I have heard in my life. I do not allow just any artist to write lyrics to my movie scores. But for her, I make the exception."

In an article written by journalist Robert Pugliese, "Arena uses her exquisite operatic (diaphragm and chest) but is sufficiently flexible to expand in Pop and Classical genre (for these singers, has coined the neologism "popera") “What is striking in the color of Arena’s voice is that even in the high register and sovracuto - a rare use of falsetto - still maintains a serious center of gravity, dark, full-bodied that accentuates her dramatic vocal delivery. In addition to phrasing, incredibly sharp, marked and a mastery of the breath which results also in the expressive essential resource."

In 2015, Arena signed to Lakeshore Records for a studio album to coincide with her book Where Did They Film That Italy. The album, titled Where Did They Film That Italy – The Music Journey, was released in June 2016 as a companion to the travel guide and features Arena performing award-winning songs from movies filmed exclusively in Italy.

Romina has performed live for world figures including President Bill Clinton at the White House, Pope John Paul II at The Vatican, and Italian greats Luciano Pavarotti, Andrea Bocelli, and performed with Alessandro Safina in Las Vegas.  According to her interviews and press releases, she has also worked with and/or performed live with Lou Rawls, Brian Wilson of the Beach Boys, Bill Conti, Al Martino, Gladys Knight, The Platters, Eliot Sloan from Blessid Union of Souls, Eric Rigler (pipes player from the famous music soundtracks of the movies Braveheart and Titanic 1997 film) According to one press release, she also headlined on the Celine Dion stage at The Colosseum at Caesars Palace in Las Vegas.  Besides touring the United States, Arena has performed in several countries worldwide including Italy, Germany, Spain, France, Belgium, Luxembourg, Austria, England, Portugal, Gibraltar, Casablanca, the Netherlands, Japan, Australia, Singapore, Thailand, New Zealand and Fiji.

Romina Arena has starred and produced national TV specials with PBS, ABC-Disney, and ESPN and has written music for soundtracks in film and television. Her song Every Day Is Christmas Day was written and released for the Hallmark movie, A Christmas To Remember. Her live TV specials include an national PBS concert special appearing as the lead female singer-songwriter along with pianist Jim Wilson, etc. live at the Globe-News Center for the Performing Arts in Amarillo Texas. Romina's ABC-Disney's Holiday Movie Skating Spectacular was hosted by Kristi Yamaguchi, Brian Boitano, and World Champion Kimmie Meissner alongside a cast of various Olympic figure skating stars performing on ice to holiday music performed live by Romina and special guests, The Four Phantoms, the show airing twice in North America on ABC reaching over 50 million households worldwide, in an additional 77 countries around the world on ESPN.

Discography
 1984 to 1993 – From the age of 4 to 13 years old Arena was signed to Disney Italy's Mickey Mouse Club and the companies "Prima Ribalta", "Shasa Digital Sound" and released three compilations and singles – Italy
 1994 "Una Vita Senza Vita" from San Remo Nuovi Talenti (New Talent) Festival Compilation – Italy (appeared as Romina Notarbartolo)
 1994 "You're The Only One" Peter Ciani Music – Australia (Single)
 1994: "Smile" released by Danilo Sulis Recordings – Sicily, Italy (Single)
 1994 "As Beautiful as You" CP Productions/BMG – Germany
 1995 "As Beautiful as You" CP Productions/BMG – Australia
 1998: "Fateci Santi" for The Vatican & Pope John Paul the second, produced & released by Beppe CAntarelli – compilation album
 2000 "Unreleased Album Project" produced by Bob Johnston – US
 2001 "Subaru" Design House/Toshiba-EMI – Japan
 2003 "Romina Arena" for Miller's Gin – Miller Spirits – US & UK (Premium)
 2003 "Satellite" Soundtrack from Xbox Video Game Project Gotham Racing 2, Microsoft Game Studios – US/Italy/International
 2004 "Romina Arena" American Entertainment Records– US
 2006 You're Gonna Hear from Me Outback Records – US
 2006 "Cuerpo Sin Alma" (Spanish) Outback Records – US
 2008 "Believe" NMG Records (Single)
 2009 "A Joyful Christmas" NMG Records
 2010 "Romanza" (The Love Collection, Limited Edition) – NMG Records
 2010 "How Do You Keep the Music Playing?" NMG/Macs Records – Italy/US
 2010 Romina Arena first artist to debut live concert in US "Second Life" video game
 2011 "A Mother's Prayer" NMG Records (Single)
 2011 "Arthur's Theme" (The Best That You Can Do) NMG Records (Single)
 2011 "Life" released September 6, 2011 – NMG Records
 2012 "Morricone.Uncovered" released September 18, 2012 Perseverance Records 
 2012 "Un Sogno Che Sognai" "I Dreamed a Dream" from Les Misérables released December 4, 2012 Perseverance Records (Single)
 2013 "Romanza" (The Love Collection, Limited Edition) Re-release with new bonus tracks January 8, 2013 – NMG Records
 2013 "Subaru" "スバル" " Romina Sings Japanese" released January 8, 2013 – NMG Records
 2013 "I Want Love" from the album "The Best of Silent Hill" released October 29 – Perseverance Records  
 2014 "Corazon Italiano" released June, NMG Records (Single)
 2014 "Annie's Song" released November 4, PoperaStar Records (Single) 
 2015 "A Mother's Heart" April 28, PoperaStar Records 
 2016 "Where Did They Film That Italy – The Music Journey" based on the book from the same title – Lakeshore Records released June 24
 2019 "Baby Mine" performed in tribute to Disney's Dumbo – Poperastar Records (Single)
 2019 "A Beautiful Surprise" released November 9, 2019 – Poperastar Records (Album)
 2020 "Holding You" English version, released February 6, 2020 – Poperastar Records (Single)
 2020 "Verte Amor" Spanish version, released February 6, 2020 – Poperastar Records (Single)
2021 "Cinematica: Vol. 1" English-Italian-Spanish tribute to the greatest movie soundtracks of all time – Poperastar Records (Album)

Books
 Where Did They Film That Italy (travel guide). Fresno: Linden/ Quill Driver Books, 2016. ,

Awards
In 2010, Arena received several awards. She was one of the seven recipients of the Tricolor Globe Award from the organization Italian Women in the World, one of the five recipients of the CSNA Award (Confederation of the Sicilians in North America) for promoting Sicilian culture worldwide, and one of several recipients of the Golden Orb award for her philanthropic contributions to the Arts Olympus project in Long Beach, California.

In 2010, Romina Arena received the Global Citizen Humanitarian Award for her support to the children of Haiti, presented by Jim Luce of the New York Times/ Orphans International in collaboration with the  United Nations and Honorary Member HRH Prince Albert of Monaco.

In 2012, Arena was one of the 20 recipients of the Premio Sicilla for being an "Ambassador of bel canto in the world".

In 2020, Romina Arena received the prestigious “Filming Italy Los Angeles" Spotlight Award presented by Variety Magazine and Filming Italy LA for achievement in the music industry and cinema soundtrack, in collaboration with the Italian Institute of Culture and the Italian Embassy of Los Angeles 

In 2021, Romina Arena was named the "Official Ambassador of Italian Excellence In The World" by the President of M.I.R.E. (Movement of Italians Residents Abroad) representing Italy and major Italian cultural events, awards, consumer experiences around the world

Charity work
Arena has worked with several non-profit organizations by appearing at fundraising events, including the American Red Cross The Arts Olympus, and Every Woman,

References

External links
Romina Arena Official website

1980 births
Living people
American women singer-songwriters
Ballad musicians
French-language singers of the United States
Italian emigrants to the United States
Italian women singer-songwriters
Italian television personalities
Japanese-language singers
Singers from Los Angeles
Spanish-language singers of the United States
Musicians from Palermo
Torch singers
EMI Records artists
Italian women writers
Italian writers
20th-century American women singers
20th-century American singers
21st-century American women singers
21st-century American singers
People from Palermo
20th-century Italian women singers
21st-century Italian women singers
Singer-songwriters from California